Invalidity Benefit was a benefit from the United Kingdom's National Insurance scheme that was introduced in 1971 by Edward Heath's government. It was paid to people who had been invalided out of their trade or occupation after sustaining an injury or developing a long-term illness. It was replaced by Incapacity Benefit in 1995.

History
In September 1971, Keith Joseph, then Secretary of State at the Department of Health and Social Security, introduced Invalidity Benefit in the National Insurance Act 1971.

The caseload grew rapidly from the middle of the 1980s.

In 1995, the Conservative Secretary of State for Social Security, Peter Lilley, abolished Invalidity Benefit for fresh claims and replaced it with Incapacity Benefit. The Prime Minister of the day, John Major, had complained about the burgeoning caseload, saying: "Frankly, it beggars belief that so many more people have suddenly become invalids, especially at a time when the health of the population has improved".

Eligibility
Men under the age of 65 and women under 60 were entitled to claim Invalidity Benefit. To be eligible for Invalidity Benefit, claimants needed to have claimed a short-term sickness benefit, such as Statutory Sick Pay for 28 weeks prior to the claim and have paid National Insurance contributions. The claimant's age and qualifications were taken into consideration when deciding if the claimant was capable of working.

Payment
Invalidity Benefit consisted of three components:
 Invalidity Pension, which was paid at the same rate as the state pension.
 Invalidity Allowance, which was an additional payment for people under 50 years old. This was only available to people who started claiming the benefit before 1985.
 Additional Pension, which was for people who belonged to an occupational pension scheme or State Earnings-Related Pension Scheme (SERPS) and related to their earnings since the 6 April 1978.
Invalidity Benefit was paid at a higher rate than the unemployment benefit paid to people without disabilities. People who had been on Invalidity Benefit for more than one year were paid the long-term scale rate. The table below shows the amount claimants were paid.

Controversy
Invalidity Benefit has had both a positive and negative reactions.

Improvement in finances for disabled people
Tania Burchardt from the London School of Economics has described the 1970s and 1980s as decades that were notable for an "improvement of the coverage of earnings-replacement benefits", and produced data showing that a disabled person who was unable to work would be receiving more money in real terms than they would have done in the 1950s and 1960s.

Rise in number of claimants
The number of claimants of sickness benefits increased rapidly from the 1970s onwards. In the late 1980s, unemployment levels fell without a corresponding rise in the number of jobs created, while Invalidity Benefit claims continued to rise without any indications that the population's health was declining.
A number of reasons have been proposed for this rise:

Growth in Structural Unemployment
A study published in the British Medical Journal suggested that the decline in manual employment was the main reason for rising levels of Invalidity claims, as men who had been in a manual occupation were the most likely to be claiming Invalidity Benefit. The authors of the study also suggested that people who had lost their job found claiming Invalidity Benefit preferable to claiming Unemployment Benefit because it paid more and did not carry the same stigma as being unemployed.

Changes to the Benefit System
A paper published in the Economic Journal suggested that changes to the benefits system encouraged claimants to go onto Invalidity Benefit rather than Unemployment Benefit. It argues that changes to the criteria for receiving Unemployment Benefit made it harder to receive. The paper also says that people who were near retirement age were possibly incentivised to stay on Invalidity Benefit because they could claim the benefit for five years after their retirement, and unlike the state pension, it was not taxed.

Use of Invalidity Benefit to conceal unemployment levels
There have been claims that the government was using Invalidity Benefit to lower the unemployment statistics. A report by Sheffield Hallam University showed that Invalidity Benefit claims started to rise when unemployment rose in the late 1970s and early 1980s, and argued that this indicated that many claimants were not too unwell or disabled to work, as the number of people with serious illnesses and disabilities would be expected to be constant. An earlier paper by two of the same authors made a similar argument, and showed that people living in areas where there had been a high number of job losses (such as traditional industrial areas) had the biggest growth in people claiming Invalidity Benefit. As well as this, a paper published in the Journal of Public Health Medicine argued that people with mild mental disorders were increasingly likely to claim Invalidity Benefit, and showed that the rate of people claiming Invalidity Benefit where their main disability was Depression or Anxiety had grown rapidly between 1985 and 1995, but that there was a much smaller increase in claims over the same period for potentially more disabling mental disorders, such as psychosis. The author claimed that this supported the view that the government was using Invalidity Benefit to conceal unemployment levels.

Role of GPs in assessing fitness to work
An editorial in the British Journal of General Practice published in 1990 argued that GPs felt pressured into giving patients sick notes because they did not have time to fully assess the patient's fitness to work, which was contributing to the rise in Invalidity Benefit claims.

References

Disability in the United Kingdom
Social security in the United Kingdom
1971 introductions
1971 establishments in the United Kingdom